Volodymyr Dahl East Ukrainian National University (SNU) is one of the leading establishments of higher education in Ukraine. It was founded in 1920, and in 1991 it was named after Vladimir Dal. It was the first higher educational establishment in which specialists in machine-building were trained. During World War II the institute was evacuated to Omsk (Russia). There it became the basis for the foundation of Omsk State Technical University.

Besides branches in Luhansk the university has branches in other Ukrainian cities (Sievierodonetsk, Rubizhne, Krasnodon, Antratsyt, Livadiya, Feodosiya, Yevpatoriya, Skadovsk).

Nowadays the university has level IV accreditation, with 24 faculties and nearly 1,083 professors, 742 of them PhD's. The university owns 55 buildings in east and south (Crimea) Ukraine
University has about 34,000 Ukrainian (and about 260 foreign) students and offers 124 majors. It used to be the largest machine-building institute in the former USSR.

In 2001, the university was named after Vladimir Dal (who is called Volodymyr Dahl in Ukrainian).

Since September 2014, two institutions claim to represent this university: one, that remains in Luhansk, and the other that says that university was evacuated from Luhansk to Sievierodonetsk due to the Russo-Ukrainian War.

Structure
Some of the 24 faculties of the university include:

Construction Engineering
Automobiles
Accounting and Auditing
Electromechanics
Railway Transport
Internal Combustion Engines
Computer Sciences
Labour Safety and Life Security
Archival Studies
Journalism
Politology
Sociology
Physical Education
Administration
Management
Foreign-Economic Activity Management
Metal Cutting Machine-Tools and Instruments
Chair of Electronic Industry Equipment
Physics
Chemistry
Economic Cybernetics
Marketing
Personnel Management and Economics Theory
Foreign Languages
Pedagogics
Foreign Language Skills Development
Human Problems and Philosophy of Health
Psychology
Religions
Banking
Taxation
World History
History of Ukraine

References

External links
 Official website
 
 Page on VK
 

 
Educational institutions established in 1920
1920 establishments in Ukraine
National universities in Ukraine
Institutions with the title of National in Ukraine